Mack Henry Travis (born July 3, 1970) is an American former football player who played in the National Football League for the Detroit Lions for four games in 1993.

References

Living people
1970 births
California Golden Bears football players
Detroit Lions players
Players of American football from Nevada